Employees' Provident Fund may refer to:

 Employees Provident Fund (Malaysia)
 Employees' Provident Fund (Sri Lanka)
 Employees' Provident Fund Organisation